Archibald Ritchie may refer to:

 Archibald Ritchie (British Army officer)
 Archibald Ritchie (footballer, born 1868)
 Archibald Ritchie (footballer, born 1894)